Masatake Tanabe (田部正壮 Tanabe Masatake, 21 December 1849 - 21 September 1939) was the Mayor of Hiroshima from 1917 to 1921.

Mayors of Hiroshima
1849 births
1939 deaths
Place of birth missing
Place of death missing